Fiscaglia is a comune (municipality) in the Province of Ferrara in the Italian region Emilia-Romagna, located about  northeast of Bologna and about  east of Ferrara. It was founded on 1 January 2014 from the former municipalities of Massa Fiscaglia, Migliarino and Migliaro.

References

External links
 Official website

Cities and towns in Emilia-Romagna